Events from the year 1706 in Russia

Incumbents
 Monarch – Peter I

Events

 Vyshny Volochyok Waterway

Births

Deaths

References

 
Years of the 18th century in Russia